Zafer Biryol (born 2 October 1976) is a retired Turkish professional footballer. He last played as a forward for Anadolu Selçukluspor. He is 1.82 meters tall and weighs 75 kilograms.

Club career
He was the Super Lig's top scorer in the 2004–05 season with Konyaspor. During the 2005/06 season, Zafer was transferred to Big Three club Fenerbahçe. He did not play in many games, as was used primarily as a backup. A surplus to requirements, Zafer was transferred to Bursaspor early in the 2006/07 season. He was transferred to Çaykur Rizespor at mid of 2006/07 season. Biryol retired from being a football player in 2011.

International career
He appeared in five matches for the senior Turkey national football team, debuting as a second-half substitute in a friendly against Denmark on 18 February 2004.

Prosecution 
In January 2020 he was sentenced to 6 years and 3 months imprisonment for being a member of an armed terror organization due to his links to the Gülen movement.

References

External links 
 

1976 births
Living people
Turkish footballers
Turkey international footballers
Beşiktaş J.K. footballers
Mersin İdman Yurdu footballers
Edirnespor footballers
Göztepe S.K. footballers
Konyaspor footballers
Fenerbahçe S.K. footballers
Bursaspor footballers
Çaykur Rizespor footballers
Altay S.K. footballers
Süper Lig players
Association football forwards
Turkish prisoners and detainees
Sportspeople from Rize